Seyidəhmədli or Seyd-Akhmedly or Seidakhmedli may refer to:
Aşağı Seyidəhmədli, Azerbaijan
Yuxarı Seyidəhmədli, Azerbaijan